Zygaena anthyllidis is a species of moth in the Zygaenidae family. It is found in France and Spain.

Technical description and variation (Seitz)

Z. anthyllidis Boisd. (= erebus Meig.) . With pale collar and light-red belt. The wings strongly widened, and especially the 6 spots of forewing enlarged, being more or less quadrangular. Pyrenees. — ab. flava Oberth. is the yellow aberration. — In caucasica Stgr.-Reb.[now Zygaena armena ssp. caucasica Rebel, 1901 ] the pale collar is missing and the two distal spots touch each other or are confluent; from the Caucasus. — Larva yellow, with the head, thoracical legs and transverse bands black; on Trefoil. Pupa in a white ovate cocoon of which the frontal end is directed downwards (Oberthur).
 The wingspan is 30–38 mm.

Biology
Adults are on wing in July and August.
The larvae feed on Lotus (including  Lotus alpinus), Coronilla, Trifolium, Anthyllis and other Fabaceae species. The larvae usually overwinter twice.

References

Moths described in 1828
Zygaena
Moths of Europe